Seo Hye-won is a South Korean actress. She is known for her roles in dramas such as True Beauty, Cheongdam-dong Alice,Welcome 2 Life, Nevertheless, Business Proposal and Alchemy of Souls.

Filmography

Film

Television series

Web series

References

External links
 
 

1993 births
Living people
21st-century South Korean actresses
South Korean television actresses
South Korean film actresses
South Korean web series actresses